Fourth Ward School is a historic school building located at Seneca Falls in Seneca County, New York.  It is a two-story "T" shaped brick structure built in 1869 in the Italianate style. The structure features a hipped roof with a distinctive cupola. It ceased being used as a school in 1933 and converted to apartments. It is located within the boundaries of the Women's Rights National Historical Park.

It was listed on the National Register of Historic Places in 1986.

References

School buildings on the National Register of Historic Places in New York (state)
Italianate architecture in New York (state)
School buildings completed in 1869
Buildings and structures in Seneca County, New York
1869 establishments in New York (state)
National Register of Historic Places in Seneca County, New York
Seneca Falls, New York